Wang Shilin (born 13 October 1914, date of death unknown) was a Chinese athlete. He competed in the men's triple jump at the 1936 Summer Olympics.

References

1914 births
Year of death missing
Athletes (track and field) at the 1936 Summer Olympics
Chinese male triple jumpers
Olympic athletes of China
Place of birth missing